Brachmia anisopa is a moth in the family Gelechiidae. It was described by Edward Meyrick in 1918. It is found in Colombia.

The wingspan is about 15 mm. The forewings are dark purplish grey with two ochreous-brown discal spots finely edged with blackish, representing the stigmata, the first before the middle, larger, transverse oval, connected with the dorsum by a subquadrate spot of blackish suffusion edged laterally with whitish, the second at three-fifths, round, partially edged finely whitish. There is a small whitish spot on the costa at four-fifths, with indications of a transverse series of minute whitish dots beneath it. There is also a marginal series of minute blackish dots around the apex and termen, edged anteriorly by minute white dots. The hindwings are grey.

References

Moths described in 1918
Brachmia
Taxa named by Edward Meyrick
Moths of South America